James Hogan was an American trade unionist. He is best known for being a leading member of the American Railway Union. He was also a member of the Brotherhood of Railroad Trainmen (Salt Lake lodge #68) and secretary of its grievance committee on the Union Pacific Railroad.

References

American Railway Union people
Brotherhood of Railroad Trainmen people